The Flambeau River is a tributary of the Chippewa River in northern Wisconsin, United States. The Chippewa is in turn a tributary of the upper Mississippi River. The Flambeau is an important recreational destination in the region. It is notable among canoeists in the Midwest for outstanding canoe camping, including excellent scenery, fishing and whitewater. The river and its forks have a variety of possible trip lengths from short day outings, to overnight camping, to voyages of a week or more.

Origin of name
The name flambeau means "torch" in French. Many place names in Wisconsin have French origins due to the early French explorers, trappers and traders in the region in the colonial era. A common interpretation is that early explorers saw the local Ojibwe (Chippewa) people fishing at night by torchlight. In Ojibwe the North Fork of the Flambeau River is called Waaswaagani-ziibi (Torch-fishing River), as it flowed from Lac du Flambeau (now part of the Turtle-Flambeau Flowage), known in Ojibwe as Waaswaagani-zaaga'igan (Torch-fishing Lake).  The South Fork of the river is known in Ojibwe either as the Omashkoozo-ziibi (Elk River) or as Oniijaaniw-ziibi (Doe River).  Once the two Forks of the Flambeau come together, the river is known in Ojibwe as Manidoowiish-ziibi (Spirit-lodge River).

Hydrology
The Flambeau River rises in two major forks—the North Fork and the South Fork. Both originate in north-central Wisconsin and flow generally southwest to their confluence, then continue as the main Flambeau, also southwesterly, to the mouth at the Chippewa River near Bruce, Wisconsin. The North Fork is formed by the confluence of the Manitowish and Bear rivers just above Turtle-Flambeau Flowage (reservoir). The South Fork's source is Round Lake in northeastern Price County, Wisconsin.

Major tributaries of the Flambeau include the Turtle River, flowing into the North Fork in the Turtle-Flambeau Flowage, and the Elk River, which flows into the South Fork. Swamp Creek is the largest of 23 streams flowing into the Flambeau River.

While the South Fork is free-flowing below a small dam at the outlet of Round Lake, the North Fork and the main river have several dams that impound small reservoirs, known locally as flowages. Below the dam impounding the Turtle-Flambeau Flowage, the North Fork has three dams between Park Falls and Oxbo. On the main Flambeau below the Forks, there are four more dams: Big Falls Dam, Rural Electric Agency Dam (Dairyland Reservoir), Ladysmith (Papermill Dam), (the Port Arthur Dam until it was removed), and the Thornapple Dam.

Human settlements along the river
The communities of Park Falls and Oxbo are located along the North Fork. Fifield and Lugerville border the South Fork. Ladysmith is the only city on the main Flambeau. Generally the river flows through remote areas dominated by second-growth forest, with few road crossings or approaches.

Navigation
The Flambeau River is best known as a classic canoeing stream. Both forks are canoeable from their sources, but most trips start at or downstream of access points near Oxbo on the North Fork or Lugerville on the South Fork, and end upstream of the Big Falls Flowage on the main stem. For much of the length of these sections of river, the Flambeau and its forks flow through the Flambeau River State Forest.

The North Fork in this section is rated class I to II on the international scale of river difficulty at normal water conditions. Major named rapids are Wannigan and Flambeau Falls. The South Fork is a more difficult whitewater river, with runnable rapids up to class III and a portage at Little Falls. Major named rapids include Stonewall, Big Bull, Slough Gundy, and Scratch. Below the confluence (the Forks), the main Flambeau is class II down to the Big Falls Flowage. The notable rapids on the main Flambeau are Cedar and Beaver Dam.

Aldo Leopold in Sand County Almanac discusses Flambeau, the changes to it for canoeing, and the controversy around damming it in the 1940s.

Ecology
The Flambeau system is considered an important fish habitat and fishing resource, primarily for smallmouth bass and muskellunge (muskie).

See also
 List of rivers in Wisconsin

References

Further reading
 Seeburger, William "First up the Dore Flambeau", reprinted in Malcolm Rosholt's Lumbermen on the Chippewa beginning at page 342.  An account of building an early logging camp on the Flambeau in 1872-1873.

External links

 Life Lessons Flow Along The Flambeau River  Video produced by PBS Wisconsin

Rivers of Wisconsin
Rivers of Price County, Wisconsin
Rivers of Rusk County, Wisconsin